Markaughe is a town in western Eritrea. It is located in the Gogne subregion of the Gash-Barka region, approximately 35 km northwest of Barentu.

Towns and villages
Nearby towns and villages include:

Ad Casub (5.7 nm)
Antalla
Gogne (11.2 nm)
Hambok (6.5 nm)
Mescul (8.3 nm)
Tauda (12.4 nm)

Populated places in Eritrea